Teraplectanum is a genus of monopisthocotylean monogeneans, belonging to the family Diplectanidae. All species of the genus are parasitic on the gills of fish in the family Teraponidae.

Susan Lim (2015) described the genus on the basis of the arrangement of the copulatory apparatus and wrote: "in species of Teraplectanum, spermatozoa stored in the seminal vesicle and secretions stored in the prostatic reservoir are transferred into, and mixed to form semen within, a special sclerotized auxiliary piece".

Species
According to the World Register of Marine Species, the following species are included in the genus:

 Teraplectanum angustitubus Lim, 2015 
 Teraplectanum crassitubus Lim, 2015  (Type-species)
 Teraplectanum undulicirrosum (Zhang, Liu, Ding & Chen, 2000) Lim, 2015

References

Diplectanidae
Monogenea genera
Parasites of fish